Fresse-sur-Moselle (literally Fresse on Moselle) is a commune in the Vosges department of Grand Est in northeastern France.
The name Moselle refers to the river Moselle that bypasses. In the left of Fresse sur Moselle is situated Le Thillot and in the right of Fresse of Moselle is situated Bussang.In the top is situated Le Menil and in the bottom is situated Saint-Maurice-sur-Moselle.

Points of interest
Arboretum de Fresse-sur-Moselle
Moselle

See also
Communes of the Vosges department

References

Communes of Vosges (department)